Sergei Nikolayevich Gorb (born 29 October 1954) is a Russian football coach and a former player.

References

External links
 

1954 births
Living people
Soviet footballers
FC Dynamo Stavropol players
Russian football managers
FC Dynamo Stavropol managers
Association football defenders